Češnjovka(TSCHESH-nyov-kah) is a Croatian spicy pork garlic sausage from Turopolje.

References 

Croatian sausages
Garlic dishes